Arnold Heyworth Beckett (12 February 1920 – 25 January 2010) was a British pharmacist, academic, and expert on doping in sport.

Early life
Beckett was born on 12 February 1920 in The Fylde, Lancashire, England. He was educated at Baines School, then a grammar school in Poulton-le-Fylde. He studied at the School of Pharmacy and Birkbeck College, both part of the University of London. He completed his Bachelor of Science (BSc) degree in 1947 and his Doctor of Philosophy (PhD) degree in 1950. He took, but failed, the Civil Service entrance examination.

Career
Beckett rose to prominence in the 1970s and 1980s when steroid use amongst athletes was banned from certain competitions. He participated in several high profile investigations such as Canadian sprinter Ben Johnson who was ultimately stripped of his Olympic gold medal for testing positive for the drugs in 1988. After controversial rulings were delivered following the 1992 Barcelona Olympics, Beckett resigned from the medical commission and ultimately became an advocate for athletes accused of doping.

Honours
In July 1976, Beckett was awarded an honorary Doctor of Science (D.Sc.) degree by Heriot-Watt University.

References

1920 births
2010 deaths
English pharmacists
People from the Borough of Fylde
Alumni of the UCL School of Pharmacy
Alumni of Birkbeck, University of London
Doping in sport